

See also 
 Lists of fossiliferous stratigraphic units in Europe
 List of fossiliferous stratigraphic units in France
 List of fossiliferous stratigraphic units in Germany
 List of fossiliferous stratigraphic units in Luxembourg
 List of fossiliferous stratigraphic units in the Netherlands

References 
 

 Belgium
 
 
Fossiliferous stratigraphic units